National Secondary Route 110, or just Route 110 (or ) is a National Road Route of Costa Rica, located in the San José province.

Description
In San José province the route covers San José canton (Hospital, Hatillo districts), Alajuelita canton (Alajuelita district).

References

Highways in Costa Rica